Olga Aran Méndez (February 5, 1925 – July 29, 2009) was the first Puerto Rican woman elected to a state legislature in the United States mainland, when, in 1978, she became a member of the New York State Senate.

Early years
Olga Aran Méndez was born in Mayagüez, Puerto Rico.
One of eight children, she was raised on the island in a middle class and highly educated family. Her mother, Ursula Garcia Fernández (b. 1894), was heir to a substantial family fortune along with her three sisters; she died when Olga was nine years old. Olga's father, Gonzalo Aran Soler (d. 1948), was a Clerk of the Court. His family, the Arans, were among the first French families to immigrate to Puerto Rico in the 19th century.

In 1950, Méndez received a Bachelor of Science degree from the University of Puerto Rico, afterwards teaching high school chemistry on the island. In 1960, she earned her Master's Degree in Psychology from the Teacher's College at Columbia University. In 1975, she defended her Doctoral Dissertation in Educational Psychology and received her Ph.D from Yeshiva University.

Méndez married into a respected East Harlem political family. Her father-in-law, Antonio "Tony" Méndez was the first Puerto Rican district leader in Manhattan. She became involved in the fight for better government through her family members and became an active leader in the area of voter registration drives throughout the nation.

Political career
In 1972, Méndez was elected as a New York Delegate, committed to Senator George McGovern at the Democratic National Convention. In 1974, she was elected to the "National Conference of Women" in Houston, Texas.

On April 11, 1978, she was elected to the New York State Senate, to fill the vacancy caused by the election of Robert García to the U.S. Congress. She was re-elected several times, and remained in the State Senate until 2004, sitting in the 182nd, 183rd, 184th, 185th, 186th, 187th, 188th, 189th, 190th, 191st, 192nd, 193rd, 194th and 195th New York State Legislatures. Méndez was a delegate to the 1980, 1984 and 1988 Democratic National Conventions.. Méndez was a delegate to the 1980, 1984 and 1988 Democratic National Conventions. In 1984, she was chosen as Secretary of the Senate Minority Conference. In 1993, Méndez became the first Puerto Rican woman to be chosen Chairperson of the Senate Minority Conference. At times Méndez offered her political support to Republicans when doing so would have been beneficial to her district. She was often criticized by her peers for this bi-partisanship.

In December 2002, Méndez left the Democratic Party and joined the Republican Party, as she felt that "she and the voters had been taken for granted by the Democrats."
Switching parties made re-election very tenuous in her heavily Democratic and majority-Hispanic district. On November 4, 2004, Méndez was heavily defeated by José M. Serrano, son of U.S. Congressman José E. Serrano, taking only 18 percent of the vote. During her final six months in office she served as the Chairwoman of the Senate Labor Committee.

Death  and legacy 
Méndez was diagnosed with breast cancer in 1993 and underwent surgery. She said that she shared her story in order to educate others. She died after a 16-year battle at her East Harlem apartment on July 29, 2009, aged 84.

New York City's Mayor, Michael Bloomberg, an Independent, who was both a former Democrat and a former Republican, credited Méndez with impressing upon him the "importance of reaching across partisan lines to do what's right for your constituents." Bloomberg stated the following:

Legacy
Among the many awards and recognitions which Méndez was awarded were the following:
the Operation Push National Citizenship Award,
Effective Leadership Golden Age Award
Hunter College Presidential Medal of Honor

She was also named to the Civil Liberties Honor Roll. A public housing building which bears her name was constructed in Spanish Harlem in Manhattan.

See also

List of Puerto Ricans
History of women in Puerto Rico

References

Further reading
Paterson, David "Black, Blind, & In Charge: A Story of Visionary Leadership and Overcoming Adversity."Skyhorse Publishing. New York, New York, 2020

External links
New York Times coverage of Méndez
New York Times obituary with correct date of birth
 

1925 births
2009 deaths
American politicians of Puerto Rican descent
Hispanic and Latino American women in politics
Deaths from cancer in New York (state)
Deaths from breast cancer
Teachers College, Columbia University alumni
New York (state) Democrats
New York (state) Republicans
New York (state) state senators
People from East Harlem
People from Mayagüez, Puerto Rico
University of Puerto Rico alumni
Yeshiva University alumni
Women state legislators in New York (state)
20th-century American politicians
20th-century American women politicians
Puerto Rican people in New York (state) politics
Hispanic and Latino American state legislators in New York (state)